Frank Coe may refer to:
 Frank Coe (government official), United States government official alleged to be a Soviet spy
 Frank Coe (Lincoln County War), Old West cowboy, gunman, and member of the Lincoln County Regulators
 Frank W. Coe, United States Army general